AC Cars, originally incorporated as  Auto Carriers Ltd., is a British specialist automobile manufacturer and one of the oldest independent car makers founded in Britain. As a result of bad financial conditions over the years, the company was renamed or liquidated many times until its present form. In 2022, the new corporate structure began the production of new AC Cobra models, with a slightly modified structure to adapt it to modern safety and technology requirements and obtain the European road homologation certificate.

History

The Weller brothers prototype 

The first car from what eventually became AC was presented at the Crystal Palace motor show in 1903; it was a 20 HP touring car and was displayed under the Weller name. The Weller brothers of West Norwood, London, planned to produce an advanced  car.

However, their financial backer and business manager John Portwine, a butcher, thought the car would be too expensive to produce and encouraged Weller to design and produce a little delivery three-wheeler.

Autocars and Accessories 

In 1904, a new company was founded and named Autocars and Accessories; production started with the Auto-Carrier. The vehicle caught on quickly and was a financial success. Three years later, a passenger version appeared, called the A.C. Sociable. It had a seat in place of the cargo box.

The A.C. Sociable was described in a review of the 1912 Motor Cycle and Cycle Car Show as "one of the most popular cycle cars on the road, both for pleasure and business", and A.C. displayed eight vehicles on their stand, six for pleasure and two for business. The single rear wheel contained a two-speed hub, and the single-cylinder engine was mounted just in front of it, with rear chain drive.

Auto Carriers Ltd. 

The company became Auto Carriers Ltd. in 1911 and moved to Ferry Works, Thames Ditton, Surrey — at this time, they also began using the famed "AC" roundel logo. They continued to produce the commercial 3-wheeler tricars and the A.C. Sociable now frequently referred to in their adverts as the Mighty Atom. Their first four-wheeled car was produced in 1913; it was a sporty two-seater with a gearbox on the rear axle. Only a few were built before production was interrupted by the First World War. During the First World War, the Ferry Works factory produced shells and fuses for the war effort, although at least one vehicle was designed and built for the War Office.

At the end of the war, Auto Carriers started making motor vehicles again, designing and building many successful cars at Ferry Works, as well as expanding into an old balloon factory on Thames Ditton High Street. Shortly thereafter, John Weller started on the design of a new overhead-cam six-cylinder engine. The first versions of this design were running by 1919. The Weller engine would be produced until 1963.

In 1921, Selwyn Edge (who had previously been with Napier) bought shares in the company, and was subsequently appointed governing director. He did not get along with Weller or Portwine, who resigned less than a year later. In customary fashion, Edge sought publicity for the company through motoring competition.

In 1921 Sammy Davis joined A.C. as a driver, competing in the Junior Car Club  race, for cars up to 1,500cc, at Brooklands.

AC Cars Ltd. 

In 1922, the name changed again to AC Cars Ltd. In 1923 and 1924, J.A. Joyce won the Brighton Speed Trials driving an AC. In May 1924, at Montlhéry near Paris, T.G. Gillett broke the continuous 24-hour record in a 2-litre AC, fitted with special streamlined bodywork, covering a distance of 1,949.3 miles. In 1926, the Honourable Victor Bruce, an AC employee, won the Monte Carlo Rally in his 2-litre AC. In 1927, Victor Bruce, with his wife Mildred (The Hon Mrs Victor Bruce), assisted by J.A. Joyce, set a 10-day endurance record at Montlhéry, driving an AC Six. Nevertheless, the sales started to fall.

AC (Acedes) Ltd. 
Selwyn Edge bought the company outright for £135,000 in 1927 and re-registered it as AC (Acedes) Ltd., but sales, which had been falling, continued to decline. The company was caught by the crash of 1929 and went into voluntary liquidation.

Production ceased for a time, and the company was sold to the Hurlock family who ran a successful haulage business. They wanted the High Street factory only as a warehouse (Ferry Works was not acquired), but allowed the service side of AC to continue.

A single car was made for William Hurlock in 1930. He liked it and agreed to restart very limited production, mainly using components left over from previous models.

An agreement was reached with Standard to supply new chassis, the ancient three-speed transaxle was replaced by a modern four-speed gearbox (built in unit with the engine), and by 1932 a new range of cars was finally launched. Production continued on this small scale, averaging less than 100 vehicles per year, until the outbreak of the Second World War in 1939. The final pre-war car was delivered in June 1940, after which the factory was fully involved with war production.

After the war, AC secured a large contract with the government to produce the fibreglass-bodied, single seat, Thundersley Invacar Type 57 invalid carriages with Villiers 2-stroke engines. The invalid carriages continued to be built until 1976 and were an important source of revenue to the company.
Production of cars restarted in 1947 with the 2-Litre, using the 1991 cc engine from the 16. The 2-Litre used an updated version of the pre-war, underslung chassis, fitted with the AC straight-six engine and traditional ash-framed and aluminium-panelled coachwork, available in saloon or convertible versions.
They also built an aluminium-bodied three-wheeled microcar, the Petite, as well as "Bag Boy" golf carts (with independent suspension to the two wheels).

In 1953, the firm began production of the AC Ace, based on a lightweight chassis designed by John Tojeiro and hand built aluminium body designed and built by Eric George Gray with the venerable Weller-designed 2-Litre engine.

For 1954, a new aluminium-bodied closed coupe was unveiled at Earls Court, the AC Aceca, pronounced A-seek-a. It was only slightly heavier than the convertible Ace, and because of better aerodynamics was actually slightly faster ( top speed).

Today, Acecas are popular at historic racing events. Arch McNeill, a factory Morgan racer from the 1940s, 1950s and 1960s told fellow Texan and Aceca owner Glenn Barnett that "the Morgan team spent two years campaigning to beat the factory AC Acecas and finally did in the late 1950s". Though more valuable than comparable AC or Shelby replicas, the Aceca is still a bargain when compared to a Shelby CSX Cobra, while maintaining similar performance.

There was a demand from some customers for a larger four-seater car, for whom AC produced the Greyhound. This was built on a stretched Ace chassis with coil suspension all around and a 2.2-litre Bristol engine.

The AC Ace LM Prototype was a single piece from the year 1958 with the unusual chassis number LM5000, which John Tojeiro designed on behalf of the brothers Hurlock specifically for the AC factory at the 24 Hours of Le Mans and for further long-distance racing. The vehicle was only  and differed fundamentally from the standard model: it had a load-bearing, lightweight, tubular steel frame without the massive ladder structure, a new front axle with single wheel suspension, this time in the form of upper and lower triangular steering with coil spring / shock units, and a newly designed pendulum axle at the rear. The open aluminium body was much flatter, with larger overhangs at the front and rear and aerodynamically rounded with a lowered down front and high tail. It was designed by artist Cavendish Morton, who also styled other sports cars. The engine and transmission unit were tuned production unit from the Bristol Type 100D2/S. After a test ride on the Brooklands circuit, just a few kilometres from the AC factory, the not yet fully tuned prototype completed two events in 1958: in June as a factory car in the Le Mans 24-hour race and in September in the Rudac Racing Team at the RAC Tourist Trophy at the Goodwood Circuit. Due to changes in the regulations, the car was no longer able to compete in the next event in its class in the FIA - Sportscar World Championship. The Bristol drivetrain went back to the manufacturer and the racing car was sold without it and later rebuilt. The Ace LM prototype remains with a collector today.

The "AC Ace Bristol Zagato" was designed and built by Zagato from the year 1958. Conceptually, the Berlinetta resembles the two-seat factory coupe ' 'AC Aceca' ', but on the chassis number BEX 477 of a left hand drive  'AC Ace Bristol'.  The idea came about at the Geneva Motor Show in 1957 during a meeting between Hubert Patthey, the then  AC  and  Aston Martin  importer for Switzerland and Elio Zagato. The original vehicle from 1957 was delivered to the Swiss company Pattheys in 1958; Who commissioned the  Carrozzeria Zagato  to produce a single, individual car body for the vehicle to be used at local races and the Pescara rally. Zagato designed and built a coupé body made of thin-walled aluminium sheet with Zagato's trademark "Double Bubble", a solid roof with two vaults above the driver's and co-driver's seat to ensure sufficient headroom at low headroom. Patthey sold the finished vehicle to an Englishman who lived in Switzerland, who was negotiating with him for various rides near Lake Geneva; Later the racing driver Jo Siffert acquired the unique car, which he used at different racing events and historical races like the Mille Miglia. On the circuit, the single took part only in a well-known race, on 5 October 1958, at the Coupes du Salon, where it won the class in the class up to 2000 cc. The vehicle is now owned by an American collector.

The Ace Bristol Zagato was fitted with a modified Bristol six-cylinder engine with 130 hp at 5750 rpm, torque 174 Nm at 4500 rpm, length , height , ready-to-run weight , top speed , Acceleration from zero to 60 miles per hour in 7.7 seconds, to 100 miles per hour in 16134.2 seconds.

The 'AC Ace-Aigle' was an aerodynamically improved one-off AC Ace Bristol-based vehicle with the BEX289 chassis number designed specifically for the Le Mans 24-hour race in 1960. The inspiration came from the Swiss AC importer Hubert Patthey, as was the case with 'AC Ace Bristol Zagato' in 1958, but was conceptually much easier. The Aigle Aigle, which has been legally independent in its own right alongside the design studio and car body builder Ghia in Turin existed. In contrast to the standard vehicle, the 'Ace-Aigle' had a modified front and a fixed hardtop. The roof top had two unusual vaults to give the rider and co-driver plenty of headroom - actually the "double bubble" design, typical of Zagato, and implemented in its 1958 coupé. The normal, aerodynamically relatively unfavourable front body of radiator grille, front fenders and bonnet was replaced by a new front and made of lightweight polyester. This was rounder, ran longer and flatter forward, and had a flat, oval cooling air intake, backlit headlights clad with plexiglas half shells. It remotely recalled the Jaguar E-Type. According to the same concept and with very similar lines,  Ghia Aigle  had already changed several Austin-Healey Sprites from 1958 to 1961 (albeit without hardtop).

The "Ace-Aigle" was used by Swiss riders André Wicky and Georges Gachnang from the Swiss racing team Ecurie Lausannoise. It completed the Le Mans test in April 1960 as the fastest vehicle, but failed to finish the June 1960 race.

A very similar "Ace Bristol" with chassis number BEX1192 appeared in Le Mans in 1962, at the same time the last Le Mans appearance of an "AC Ace" before the "AC Cobra" from 1964 was used. The car of a French private owner suffered accident damage the previous year and had been returned to the "AC" factory, where it received a special lightweight body with an aerodynamically favourable front in the style of the "Jaguar E-Type" / "Ace-Aigle". In the race, there was no clutch damage. The six-cylinder Bristol engine was optional until it ceased production in 1961.

Soon after, car dealer and racing driver Ken Rudd fitted his own competition Ace with a pre-war BMW-designed, Bristol-produced  six-cylinder engine. This combination was put into production as the AC Ace-Bristol in 1957. In this form, the car raced at Le Mans in 1957 and 1958.

There is also in existence an AC Aceca fitted with a Bristol six-cylinder engine. One prototype labelled as drawing number "A86" was made in 1959. This Aceca-Bristol had a wider body and was built on a coil-sprung chassis similar to the AC Greyhound. Also, there exists a prototype with chassis number RS 5000, featuring the standard Ace body work.

The production model of the AC Ace 2.6 (as it is latterly known today) is for many people the prettiest Ace of all—and undoubtedly the rarest, with only 36 such cars built. To fit the Zephyr engine, AC had to modify the frame, relocate the steering box and completely change the nose of the car. These changes are often mistakenly attributed to Carroll Shelby. Prototype chassis number RS 5500 featured the standard Ace body work. Its production model, the RS 5501-5507 (as it is latterly known today) is one of the rarest models, with only 7 such cars built.

In September 1961, AC was approached by Carroll Shelby to use a small block Ford Windsor V8 engine in the Ace chassis, producing the AC Cobra. Shelby needed a car that could compete with the Chevrolet Corvette in US sports car racing. Only a single example was built (CSX 2000) using a Ford 221 Windsor V8. It debuted in 1962 with a Ford 260 V8 engine. This was then superseded by the Ford 289 V8 engine.

The resulting Cobra was a very powerful roadster, and it is commonly blamed for the introduction of the  limit on British motorways. While this was a major factor in the decision, after a coupe version was caught doing  during a test run, a then-recent spate of accidents under foggy conditions also helped the introduction of the limit. Its European model was branded with the AC brand.

At the end of the 1964 racing season, the Cobra was being outclassed in sports car racing by Ferrari. Carroll Shelby decided he needed a bigger engine. A big block Ford FE series 390 V8 was installed in a Cobra but it was over-powered and the car was now almost undrivable. It was decided that a completely new chassis was needed. With the combined help of Ford's computers and the experience of the AC engineers, the new MKIII was born with  main tubes instead of  ones for the chassis, adding huge cross-braced shock towers and coil springs all around. In 1965 a competition version with a stripped interior, no glove box, different instrument layout and revised suspension was introduced. The competition version also had a more powerful motor with only one carburettor, side exhausts, a roll bar and wider fenders to accommodate racing tires. The engine that was installed in the car was Ford's famed 427 FE NASCAR "Side-Oiler" V8, a power-house engine developing  in its mildest street version.

Unfortunately, the car missed homologation for the 1965 season and was not raced by the Shelby team. However, it was raced successfully by many privateers and went on to win races all the way into the 1970s.
At the end of 1966, Shelby was left with 31 unsold competition cars; it was decided by Shelby American to sell them to the general public under the name of Cobra 427 S/C or Semi-Competition. Today these S/C cars are the most sought after models and can sell in excess of 1.5 million dollars.

In 1966 a street model of the 427 S/C was made available. It came with a tamer motor, optional dual carburettors, a glove box, and exhaust running under the car. Meanwhile, AC went on producing a milder version of the 427 MK III Cobra for the European market fitted with the small block Ford motor. The car was called the AC 289 and 27 were produced. Carroll Shelby sold the Cobra name to Ford in 1965 and went on to help develop the famed racing Ford GT40.

At the same time, the company realized they needed a grand tourer model that could appeal to wealthy customers. The new car was shown at the 1965 Turin show. A few early models were fitted with the famed 427 Ford FE motors. In 1967 the long-stroked 428 motor became available and the car was known as the AC Frua. Built out of steel rather than AC's usual aluminium, the Frua is heavier than a Cobra at slightly under . That said, it is still a light and very fast automobile built on a racing chassis. The car was never fully developed and the cost of sending chassis from England to Italy and back for final assembly made it so expensive that only a few were produced. Production ended in 1973 after only 80 cars (29 convertibles and 51 coupes) were finished.

In 1970, a special version of the coupé was built. It was based on an extended bodyshell that Frua built for Monteverdi which was supposed to become the second Monteverdi 375/L (Monteverdi chassis# 2002). After the alliance between Monteverdi and Frua broke apart in Summer 1969, that bodyshell remained in the Frua works in Turin. A year or so later Frua changed some details on front and rear, including some semi-hidden headlamps similar to those seen on the Iso Lele and the second series Iso Grifo before. The car was called AC 429; it remained a one-off.

The 1970s were not a good period for luxury car manufacturers and Derek Hurlock went searching for a totally new, smaller car. Mid-engined designs were in fashion at the time and in 1972 the Diablo, a prototype with an Austin Maxi engine and transaxle, was built by privateers Peter Bohanna and Robin Stables.

In much the same way as they had taken up the Tojeiro prototype and turned it into the Ace,  AC acquired the rights and at the 1973 London Motor Show showed their own version, the mid-engined ME3000 with the 3.0-litre Ford Essex V6 engine installed transversely over a bespoke AC-designed gearbox. Development was virtually complete in 1976 when new Type Approval regulations were introduced. A prototype failed the  crash test, and the chassis had to be redesigned. On the second attempt, the car passed with flying colours. This was a huge achievement for a tiny firm — Vauxhall had to make several attempts before the contemporary Chevette passed. For AC, such delays meant that the first production cars (now renamed 3000ME) were not delivered until 1979, by which time they were in direct competition with the Lotus Esprit. Although comfortable, brisk, nicely built and practical, the car's handling was heavily criticised by writers from Car Magazine, Autocar and Motor. AC's ambitions of selling 250 cars per year were a distant memory. After just 71 cars were sold, Hurlock called a halt to production as his health was suffering and the company was struggling in the teeth of a recession. In 1984, production stopped at Thames Ditton and the car and the AC name were licensed to a new company registered as AC (Scotland) plc run by David McDonald in a new factory in Hillington, Glasgow. Here, 30 cars were built, including a development car tested with Alfa Romeo's 2.5-litre V6 engine and a nearly complete Mark 2 prototype of the same. Regardless (or possibly because) of these developments, AC Scotland called in the receivers in 1985.

The dissolution of the company 

After selling the historic High Street works for redevelopment, AC themselves soldiered on as a service operation in the "21st Century" works on Summer Road until the Hurlock family finally sold their holdings in 1986 to William West.

After some complex machinations, the company was split between property interests and the car brand; the former was renamed and the latter was acquired by C.P.Autokraft's owner, Brian Angliss.

The Autokraft name acquiring 

In 1982, Brian Angliss was running Autokraft, a Cobra restoration shop, parts supplier and replica manufacturer. To further such pursuits, he acquired some of the tooling from Thames Ditton and created the MKIV; the car had US-spec  bumpers, a US-regulations compliant motor, and a larger interior with modern switchgear. About 480 cars were produced in his factory at Brooklands. He also produced a lightweight model which was more in tune with the original Cobra spirit, though it could not be exported to the US owing to federal regulations.

Early cars were sold as the Autokraft MKIV, but eventually Angliss acquired the rights to use the AC name. Derek Hurlock had been strongly protective of the name, but Angliss' high standards of craftsmanship won him over. When the Hurlock family finally sold up in 1986 Angliss fully acquired the AC trademark rights and set up a new AC company as a joint venture with Ford, who had also recently bought Aston Martin. A big conflict followed over the future direction for AC, but Angliss eventually won his independence as well as Ford's continuing and essential cooperation as an engine and parts supplier.

Also interested in aircraft, Angliss restored a Hawker Hurricane XIIB at Brooklands as well as acquiring two ex–Indian Air Force Hawker Tempest IIs as future projects. The Hurricane was registered as G-HURR and was destroyed in a fatal accident at the Shoreham air show in 2007.

Angliss looked for a new car to complement and perhaps replace the MKIV. At the 1993 London Motor Show, he introduced a new vehicle that he named the AC Ace. It was a modern automobile with a stainless steel chassis and an aluminium body, but was expensive to develop and build. The costs hit Angliss hard and he sold his large motor bike collection, vintage Bentley and other assets to try to make ends meet. The receivers were called in by 1996 after approximately 50 "new" Aces had been built.

AC Car Group Ltd. 
In March 1996, largely due to the cost of developing the new Ace, Angliss' company went into receivership and was eventually sold to South African businessman Alan Lubinsky in December 1996, who continued car production in Weybridge, Surrey, under the name of AC Car Group Ltd.

Both the Cobra Mk IV and the Ace were made, and soon a 'CRS' version of the Mk IV was announced with a carbon fibre body shell, a 212 S/C version with Lotus twin-turbo V8 power, as well as the AC Superblower with a supercharger Ford V8. Two Aceca coupes (in closed version of the Ace) were also made.

AC Motor Holdings Ltd. 

In August 2002, AC Motor Holdings Ltd. was incorporated in Malta.

In 2003, Carroll Shelby International and AC Motor Holdings Ltd. announced the production of an authentic Shelby/AC Cobra, with the production vehicle arriving at dealers in July 2004. Initially, available models included Shelby AC 427 S/C Cobra and Shelby AC 289 FIA Cobra, which would be branded as the CSX 1000 and CSX 7500 Series, respectively. In February 2004, the first handcrafted aluminium body shell was built at Frimley works.

In 2004, a new manufacturing plant was opened in Malta and production of the carbon-fibre-bodied AC MkV began. Due to problems with the factory building, production ceased in 2007.

Acedes Holdings LLC 

In August 2008, Acedes Holdings LLC was incorporated in St Kitts.

In 2008, AC announced a joint venture with Brooklands Motor Company (the spiritual successor of Autokraft) in Weybridge, Surrey, UK and confirmed plans for the continuation of the traditional AC designed tubular chassis and aluminium-bodied models.

In April 2009, a joint venture in Germany was announced to manufacture the new AC MKVI. Following a supply deal with GM, the AC MKVI had a novel spaceframe chassis, 6.2-litre V8 engine and 6-speed manual transmission, and new Corvette brakes, retaining the original shape in lightweight composite material with the moulds taken from an original AC MKIII body. The car went into series production in July 2012 after two years of intense prototyping and development.

In 2010, AC announced a joint venture with the USA-based company Iconic which resulted in the design of the ultimate "Cobra": the "Iconic AC Roadster".

At the Geneva Motor Show in 2012, AC Cars showed three different models: the AC MK VI, AC MK II Classic, and AC 378 GT Zagato.

In 2020, AC Cars announced that they will be building a zero-emission version of the Cobra called the Series 1 Electric. 58 of these electric sports cars will be built alongside a 2.3-litre petrol version called the AC Cobra 140 Charter Edition.

In 2022, the new corporate structure began the production of 663 new AC Cobra models, with a slightly modified structure to adapt it to modern safety and technology requirements and obtain the European road homologation certificate.

Car models

After the Second World War

AC Autokraft Models

AC Car Group Models

Superformance Export Models

AC Motor Holdings Models

ACEDES Holdings Models

Trains and railbuses 

In 1949, AC Cars produced four trains, each consisting three power cars and four coaches, for the Southend Pier Railway in Essex. These remained in use until 1976.
The company also ventured briefly into the railway rolling stock business, building five four-wheel railbuses for British Rail in 1958.

See also
 British motor industry
 List of car manufacturers of the United Kingdom

References

Other sources
Rinsey Mills. AC Six Cylinder Sports Cars In Detail 1933–1963. Herridge

External links

 AC Cars – official website
 AC Cobra – official page 2022
 AC Heritage website
 
 AC cars on 3-wheelers.com
 AC built railcar

Companies based in Surrey
Borough of Elmbridge
Luxury motor vehicle manufacturers
Motor vehicle manufacturers based in London
Rolling stock manufacturers of the United Kingdom
Sports car manufacturers
Vehicle manufacturing companies established in 1901
1901 establishments in England